Jalchatra Bazaar is a market of Arankhola Union, Madhupur Upazila, Tangail District, Bangladesh. It is situated 56 km northeast of Tangail and 44 km southwest of Mymensingh deep in the Madhupur Jungle.

Jalchatra Bazaar is widely popular for its banana and pineapple market. Madhupur tract is very fertile for banana and pineapple production. About 80 percent of pineapples of Bangladesh are produced in Madhupur Upazila. These pineapples and bananas are all resembled in Jalchatra by the distributors to sell the fruits to the buyers from all over Bangladesh.

Photo gallery

References

Bazaars
Populated places in Tangail District